Stanislav Pertsov (born 5 September 1992, in Kharkiv) is a Ukrainian former competitive figure skater. He competed at two World Junior Championships and won the 2012 senior national title.

Programs

Competitive highlights 
JGP: Junior Grand Prix

References

External links 
 
 Stanislav Pertsov at Figure Skating Online

Ukrainian male single skaters
1992 births
Living people
Sportspeople from Kharkiv
Competitors at the 2011 Winter Universiade